The Europe/Africa Zone was one of the three zones of the regional Davis Cup competition in 1995.

In the Europe/Africa Zone there were three different tiers, called groups, in which teams competed against each other to advance to the upper tier. Winners in Group I advanced to the World Group Qualifying Round, along with losing teams from the World Group first round. Teams who lost in the first round competed in the relegation play-offs, with winning teams remaining in Group I, whereas teams who lost their play-off were relegated to the Europe/Africa Zone Group II in 1996.

Participating nations

Draw

  and  relegated to Group II in 1996.

First round

Morocco vs. Romania

Hungary vs. Portugal

Slovenia vs. Zimbabwe

Norway vs. Israel

Relegation play-offs

Portugal vs. Romania

Israel vs. Slovenia

References

External links
Davis Cup official website

Davis Cup Europe/Africa Zone
Europe Africa Zone Group I